The Circuit de Cadours was a race track located in the southwest of France, in the Tarn-et-Garonne .

Historic race track of Cadours Laréole 

Cadours is now part of the Toulouse city district. At the time of the start of the race-track, Cadours and more importantly its 600 inhabitants have demonstrated their capability to organise important events, "first flight event" in the 1920, air shows later, horse races and cycle races, too, before World War II.

An inhabitant from Cadours, surrounded by his friends, decided to establish an automobile event, his name: Louis Arrivet.  He was a local mechanic and owned a car repair shop in the middle of the village. He was a fan of nice pieces of machinery of nice mechanic. He owned a Bugatti 47. He was also an engine tuning specialist and his skills were well known beyond the limits of the county. His address book was impressive, it included a range of sports car enthusiasts which will allow him to bring together, with the help of a newly appointed organizing committee, for a very first event called "Cadours Stop and Go" about 20 competitors.
The committee included Mr Gros, Mr Gabrielle as secretary and Mr Arrivet. They went to the "Laguepie" race track in the nearby département to pick some good ideas. They decided to pick the triangle formed by the D29, D89 and D41, all secondary tortuous roads to form the Cadours Circuit or race-track, located just outside the village of Cadours, some bales of straw would prevent major crashes while few wood barracks would become the pits. On September 18, 1948 about twenty cars had registered for the event, with René Mauriès on Simca Gordini, Michel Lecerf on Simca Deho, Roger Armichen on Simca, Robert Galy on Galy Spéciale and Émile Py on Py (using Traction Citroën parts).

1949: a new Grand-Prix 

For the 1949 season, Arrivet and his crew achieved Grand-Prix status for the event, the Grand-Prix of Cadours by the French Automobile Club in the Voiturette/Formula 2 category. The event was launched and became an International Grand-Prix event in the following years, where big shots will come at the end of the racing season to harvest a couple of missing points to ensure a proper ranking or would come to finish adjustments of their next season's race cars.
The first Grand Prix de Cadours was raced on 18 September 1949, in front of more than 3000 spectators. It was a success. Gerbout, from Paris, came with his Gerbout Spéciale (an old Lombard) and won the race.

In 1950, the committee decided to meet with reputable competitors assembled at a nearby event on the Lespare race track, near Bordeaux, where a Formula 2 challenge is organized to push them to come to race in Cadours.
It is a success. The start line will witness people like Aldo Gordini, René Bonnet, Élie Bayol, Marcel Balsa, René Simone, Harry Schell and Raymond Sommer. Also a motorcycle event is organized in conjunction with the race car event, improving further the recognition of the event and the race track.

Tragic accident 
This second Grand Prix, in 1950, was bereaved by the accidental death of Raymond Sommer, and killed by the failure of the steering mechanism of his Cooper T12-Jap.  The resulting crash was fatal.

On September 9, 1951, the following year, before the start of the third 'Grand Prix de Cadours', a monument sculpted by Lucien Passey, to the memory of Raymond Sommer was unveiled. This monument was funded by people's money collection. A second identical monument was set in Mouzon, in the French Ardennes, the village where Sommer was born.

The following year, on June 2, 1952, Juan Manuel Fangio came to Cadours to honor his late friend, in the name of the Argentine people.

In 1955, most of the race car events were cancelled because of the Le Mans accident. Drastic safety measures were set in place. Most would lead to too expensive investment. At this time several events died. It became the beginning of the end of the "Circuit de Cadours-Laréole" as for several other in France and in Europe.

In 1957, a sports car category event was organised. It was won by André Loens who shortly afterward died in a Monthléry accident.

The two last events will happen in the "Formula Junior" category, recently defined. The last racing event was won by Jo Siffert who became a Swiss celebrity.

In 1958, Keith Campbell, world 350 cc champion,  was leading the 500 cc race when he failed to round a bend known as Cox’s Corner, crashed, and was killed instantly. According to a newspaper report, in trials he had beaten all records for the circuit, lapping at 71.5 miles an hour.

Every two years since 1998, the event is organized to gather owners and fans of oldtimers on a race track organised for this purpose.

Results

References

External links 
 Cadours city website

Defunct motorsport venues in France
Sports venues in Toulouse